Rauni Essman (8 April 1918 – 21 May 1999) was a Finnish sprinter. She competed in the women's 100 metres at the 1936 Summer Olympics.

References

External links
 

1918 births
1999 deaths
Athletes (track and field) at the 1936 Summer Olympics
Finnish female sprinters
Olympic athletes of Finland
Place of birth missing
Olympic female sprinters